Glenn R. Robinson (born November 13, 1944) is a retired American basketball coach who coached the men's team at Franklin and Marshall College in Lancaster, Pennsylvania for 48 years. He is the all-time wins leader in Division III men's basketball history with over 900 career victories. He announced his retirement on November 5, 2019.

Robinson grew up in Yeadon, Pennsylvania. He played high school basketball and baseball at Lansdowne-Aldan High School and then attended West Chester University, where he continued a standout career in both sports. Robinson graduated from West Chester in 1967 and was inducted into the school's athletic Hall of Fame in 2004.

Robinson came to Franklin and Marshall in 1968 as an assistant coach and became the head coach in 1971. Robinson's first season saw Franklin and Marshall improve to 7-14 and then again to 11-13 in his second season at the helm. The 1974 team achieved a record of 13-11, the program's best season since 1959. Robinson led the Diplomats to a school record 17 wins in 1976. He would go on to reset that record again in 1977 with 22 wins, 1979 with 27, 1991 with 28, and finally in 1996 with 29 victories.

Throughout his tenure, Robinson has coached numerous All-Americans. Former player and All-American Donnie Marsh is currently an assistant coach at UAB. Marsh also served as an assistant under Mike Davis at Indiana University from 2004-2006. Chris Finch, another one of Robinson's 15 All-Americans, is currently the offensive coach of the Houston Rockets of the NBA. Finch also played professionally and coached in Europe for several seasons and serves as the head coach for Great Britain men's national team.

Robinson has coached the Diplomats to the NCAA Division III Tournament 23 times, most recently in 2012, when the team reached the Elite Eight and finished with a 28-3 record. His teams have advanced to the Sweet 16 on 16 occasions and to the Elite Eight 10 times. Robinson has also led the Diplomats to five Final Fours, in 1979, 1991, 1996, 2000, and 2009. His 1991 team finished as National Runner-Up after falling to Wisconsin-Platteville in the national championship. He was named the Basketball Times Division III "Coach of the Year" in 1991 and has been named National Association of Basketball Coaches "Coach of the Year" 12 times, most recently in 2004, after guiding the Diplomats to a 26-4 record, Centennial Conference title, and Elite Eight appearance.

Robinson's success reached a high point when he became the all-time wins leader in Division III history by winning his 667th game against Muhlenberg College on February 14, 2004. Robinson is one of only four coaches in NCAA history to amass 900 career wins, putting him on the list with coaches like  Mike Krzyzewski, Herb Magee and Bobby Knight.

On Jan. 9, 2016, Robinson led his F&M Diplomats to a dramatic 57-54 victory over conference-rival Swarthmore at the Mayser Center to secure his 900th all-time win. He ended his career strong with some of his most successful seasons occurring in the final decade of his time at the helm. The Diplomats finished eight of the last 11 seasons with 20 or wins, advanced to the conference tournament in all 11 seasons, the conference finals six times and won four conference titles. The Diplomats also advanced to the NCAA Tournament on five occasions with a Final Four run, three Elite Eight showings and four Sweet 16 appearances.

Beyond the wins, Robinson has achieved a near perfect graduation rate of his players. Of all the players to play for Robinson and earn a varsity letter, all but three have gone on to earn their degrees.

Personal
Robinson has been married to Kathy for over 40 years.  He is a Presbyterian.

Head coaching record

Career highlights
 12-time NABC Coach of the Year
 1991 Basketball Times Division III Coach of the Year
 2009 D3Hoops.com Coach of the Year
 43 NCAA Tournament victories
 24 seasons with 21 or more wins
 23 NCAA DIII Tournament Appearances
 16 trips to the Sweet 16
 10 trips to the Elite Eight
 5 trips to the Final Four
 One NCAA title game appearance

See also
List of college men's basketball coaches with 600 wins

References

External links
 Franklin & Marshall profile

1944 births
American men's basketball players
Basketball coaches from Pennsylvania
Basketball players from Pennsylvania
College men's basketball head coaches in the United States
Franklin & Marshall Diplomats men's basketball coaches
Living people
People from Yeadon, Pennsylvania
Sportspeople from Delaware County, Pennsylvania
West Chester Golden Rams baseball players
West Chester Golden Rams men's basketball players